Phyllophaga fraterna is a species of scarab beetle in the family Scarabaeidae. It is found in North America.

Subspecies
These two subspecies belong to the species Phyllophaga fraterna:
 Phyllophaga fraterna fraterna Harris, 1842
 Phyllophaga fraterna mississippiensis Davis, 1920

References

Further reading

 

Melolonthinae
Articles created by Qbugbot
Beetles described in 1842